Vidania may refer to:
Vidania, a village, part of the municipality of Bidania-Goiatz (Spanish: Bidegoyan) in the province of Gipuzkoa, in the Basque Country of Spain
Vidania, a 2006 album by La Buena Vida, an indie pop group from Spain